Joseph Jérôme Lefrançois de Lalande (11 July 1732 – 4 April 1807) was a French astronomer, freemason and writer.

Biography

Lalande was born at Bourg-en-Bresse (now in the département of Ain) to Pierre Lefrançois and Marie‐Anne‐Gabrielle Monchinet. His parents sent him to Paris to study law, but as a result of lodging in the Hôtel Cluny, where Delisle had his observatory, he was drawn to astronomy, and became the zealous and favoured pupil of both Delisle and Pierre Charles Le Monnier. Having completed his legal studies, he was about to return to Bourg to practise as an advocate, when Lemonnier obtained permission to send him to Berlin, to make observations on the lunar parallax in concert with those of Lacaille at the Cape of Good Hope.

 
The successful execution of this task obtained for him, before he was twenty-one, admission to the Academy of Berlin, as well as his election as an adjunct astronomer to the French Academy of Sciences. He now devoted himself to the improvement of the planetary theory, publishing in 1759 corrected edition of Edmond Halley's tables, with a history of Halley's Comet whose return in that year he had helped Alexis Clairaut and Nicole-Reine Lepaute to calculate. In 1762 Delisle resigned the chair of astronomy in the Collège de France in Lalande's favour. The duties were discharged by Lalande for forty-six years. His house became an astronomical seminary, and amongst his pupils were Delambre, Giuseppe Piazzi, Pierre Méchain, and his own nephew Michel Lalande. By his publications in connection with the transit of Venus of 1769 he won great fame. However, his difficult personality lost him some popularity.

In 1766, Lalande, with Helvetius, founded the "Les Sciences" lodge in Paris, and received its recognition from Grand Orient de France in 1772. In 1776, he changed its name to Les Neuf Soeurs, and arranged for Benjamin Franklin to be chosen as the first worshipful master.

Although his investigations were conducted with diligence rather than genius, Lalande's career was an eminent one. As a lecturer and writer he helped popularise astronomy. His planetary tables, into which he introduced corrections for mutual perturbations, were the best available up to the end of the 18th century. In 1801, he endowed the Lalande Prize, administered by the French Academy of Sciences, for advances in astronomy.
Pierre-Antoine Véron, the young astronomer who for the first time in history determined the size of the Pacific Ocean from east to west, was Lalande's disciple.

Lalande was an atheist, and wrote a dictionary of atheists with supplements that appeared in print posthumously.

He never married but he had an illegitimate daughter Marie-Jeanne de Lalande whom he trained in mathematics so that she could help him with his work.

Near discovery of Neptune

In February 1847 Sears C. Walker of the US Naval Observatory was searching historical records and surveys for possible prediscovery sightings of the planet Neptune that had been discovered the year before. He found that observations made by Lalande's staff in 1795 were in the direction of Neptune's position in the sky at that time and that Neptune might appear in the observation records. On 8 May and again on 10 May 1795 a star was observed and recorded with uncertainty noted on its position with a colon, this notation could also indicate an observing error so it was not until the original records of the observatory were reviewed that it was established with certainty that the object was Neptune and the position error between the two nights was due to the planet's motion across the sky. The discovery of these records of Neptune's position in 1795 led to a better calculation of the planet's orbit.

Awards and recognition

 In 1765, Lalande was elected a member of the Royal Swedish Academy of Sciences.
 In 1781, he was elected a Foreign Honorary Member of the American Academy of Arts and Sciences.
 His name is one of the 72 names inscribed on the Eiffel Tower.
 The crater Lalande on the Moon is named after him.
 A high school in Bourg-en-Bresse is named after Lalande. This high school was awarded the Médaille de la Résistance in recognition of the wartime conduct of its teachers and pupils, a unique case among all schools in France.

Notable works

His published include:
Traité d'astronomie (1st Ed., 2 vols., 1764; 2nd Ed., 4 vols., 1771–1781; 3rd Ed., 3 vols., 1792)
Histoire céleste française (1801), giving the places of 47,390 stars
Bibliographie astronomique (1803), with a history of astronomy from 1780 to 1802
Astronomie des dames (1785)
Abrégé de navigation (1793)
Voyage d'un françois en Italie (1769), a valuable record of his travel in 1765–1766.
Journal d'un voyage en Angleterre (1763) Diary of a Trip to England (English translation 2002, 2014 including two biographies of Lalande and an examination of the structure of the diary)

He communicated more than one hundred and fifty papers to the French Academy of Sciences, edited the Connoissance de temps (1759–1774), and again (1794–1807), and wrote the concluding two volumes of the 2nd edition of Montucla's Histoire des mathématiques (1802).

Publications

See also
Lalande 21185
Les Neuf Sœurs
Felis (constellation)
Quadrans Muralis
Atlas Coelestis
Officina Typographica

Notes

References

Attribution

Further reading

Mémoires de l'Institut, VIII (1807) (JBJ Delambre)
J-B Delambre: Histoire de l'astronomie au XVIIIe siècle, p. 547
Magazin encyclopédique, II, 288 (1810) (Mme de Salm);
JS Bailly, Histoire de l'astronomie moderne, t. III, (ed. 1785)
J Mädler: Geschichte der Himmelskunde II, 141
R Wolf, Geschichte der Astronomie
JJ Lalande, Bibliographie astronomique p. 428
JC Poggendorff, Biographisch-lit. Handwörterbuch
Maximilien Marie: Histoire des sciences mathématiques et physiques IX, 35.

Alphonse Rebière, Mathématiques et mathématiciens, second edition, Paris, 1893, .

External links 
Tome premier de Traité d'astronomie, de 1764
 Abrégé de navigation (pdf)
 Portrait of Jerome Lalande from the Lick Observatory Records Digital Archive, UC Santa Cruz Library's Digital Collections
Joseph Jérôme Le Français de Lalande letters to Mme. Dupiery, MSS 530 at L. Tom Perry Special Collections, Brigham Young University
Letters from baron de Franz Xaver von Zach to Joseph Jérôme Lefrançois de Lalande (1792-1806) at the digital library, Paris Observatory

1732 births
1807 deaths
Writers from Bourg-en-Bresse
18th-century French astronomers
French atheists
Members of the French Academy of Sciences
Burials at Père Lachaise Cemetery
Les Neuf Sœurs
Members of the Prussian Academy of Sciences
Members of the Royal Swedish Academy of Sciences
Honorary members of the Saint Petersburg Academy of Sciences
19th-century French astronomers
Fellows of the American Academy of Arts and Sciences
Fellows of the Royal Society
French Freemasons